"Walk Idiot Walk" is the first single released from Swedish band the Hives' third album, Tyrannosaurus Hives (2004). It was written by Randy Fitzsimmons and produced by the Hives with Pelle Gunnerfeldt. Upon its release in June 2004, the song reached number 13 in the United Kingdom, number 15 in Sweden, and number 18 in Norway. It also reached number 19 on the US Billboard Modern Rock Tracks chart. In Australia, the song was ranked number 55 on Triple J's Hottest 100 of 2004.

Music video
The video takes place in a white room with crossword puzzle designs on the wall. Before the music starts, there's a sign with a large "!", the Hives appear. In the middle of the music video, Pelle Almqvist begins to walk on the wall, as he steps on the crossword designs, letters appear soon after, reading "Walk Idiot Walk".

Track listings
European CD single and UK 7-inch single
 "Walk Idiot Walk" – 3:30
 "Genepool Convulsions" – 2:14

UK and European enhanced CD single
 "Walk Idiot Walk" – 3:30
 "Genepool Convulsions" – 2:14
 "Keel-Hauling Class of '89" – 2:42
 "Walk Idiot Walk" (video) – 3:30

Charts

Release history

In popular culture

It was featured in a season 4 episode, "Jinx", of Smallville. It was used in the season two episode, "My Mother the Fiend" of Veronica Mars. It was used as the theme song for the 2004 WWE Raw Diva Search which later became the theme to former Diva Search winner and TNA Knockout, Christy Hemme. The main riff is similar to that of The Who's "I Can't Explain", and even more similar to Sonic 2's Metropolis Zone. The song also features in Guitar Rock Tour.

References

2004 singles
2004 songs
The Hives songs
Interscope Records singles
Polydor Records singles
Theme music